Giorgos Iosifidis (born January 8, 1969) is a former international Cypriot football midfielder and current football manager of Enosis Neon Parekklisia in the Cypriot Second Division.

He started his career in 1989 with Apollon Limassol. He also played for Anorthosis Famagusta and Aris Limassol.

External links
 

1969 births
Living people
Cypriot footballers
Cyprus international footballers
Association football midfielders
Sportspeople from Limassol
Apollon Limassol FC players
Anorthosis Famagusta F.C. players
Aris Limassol FC players
Cypriot First Division players
Cypriot football managers
Karmiotissa FC managers